Resin acid refers to mixtures of several related carboxylic acids, primarily abietic acid, found in tree resins.  Nearly all resin acids have the same basic skeleton: three fused rings having the empirical formula C19H29COOH.  Resin acids are tacky, yellowish gums that are water-insoluble.  They are used to produce soaps for diverse applications, but their use is being displaced increasingly by synthetic acids such as 2-ethylhexanoic acid or petroleum-derived naphthenic acids.

Botanical analysis
Resin acids are protectants and wood preservatives that are produced by parenchymatous epithelial cells that surround the resin ducts in trees from temperate coniferous forests. The resin acids are formed when two-carbon and three-carbon molecules couple with isoprene building units to form monoterpenes (volatile), sesquiterpenes (volatile), and diterpenes (nonvolatile) structures.

Pines contain numerous vertical and radial resin ducts scattered throughout the entire wood. The accumulation of resin in the heartwood and resin ducts causes a maximum concentration in the base of the older trees. Resin in the sapwood, however, is less at the base of the tree and increases with height.

In 2005, as an infestation of the Mountain pine beetle (Dendroctonus ponderosae) and blue stain fungus devastated the Lodgepole Pine forests of northern interior British Columbia, Canada, resin acid levels three to four times greater than normal were detected in infected trees, prior to death. These increased levels show that a tree uses the resins as a defense. Resins are both toxic to the beetle and the fungus and also can entomb the beetle in diterpene remains from secretions. Increasing resin production has been proposed as a way to slow the spread of the beetle in the "Red Zone" or the wildlife urban interface.

Chemical components

Abietic-type acids

Represents the majority 85-90% of typical tall oil.
abietic acid
abieta-7,13-dien-18-oic acid
13-isopropylpodocarpa -7,13-dien-15-oic acid
Neoabietic acid
Dehydroabietic acid
Palustric acid
Levopimaric acid
Simplified formula C20H30O2, or C19H29COOH
molecular weight 302

Pimaric-type acids

pimaric acid
pimara-8(14),15-dien-18-oic acid
isopimaric acids
simplified formula C20H30O2 or C19H29COOH
molecular weight 302

Production in tall oil (chemical pulping byproduct)

The commercial manufacture of wood pulp grade chemical cellulose using the kraft chemical pulping processes releases resin acids.  The Kraft process is conducted under strongly basic conditions of sodium hydroxide, sodium sulfide and sodium hydrosulfide, which neutralizes these resin acids, converting them to their respective sodium salts, sodium abietate, ((CH3)4C15H17COONa) sodium pimarate ((CH3)3(CH2)C15H23COONa) and so on. In this form, the sodium salts are insoluble and, being of lower density than the spent pulping process liquor, float to the surface of storage vessels during the process of concentration, as a somewhat gelatinous pasty fluid called kraft soap, or resin soap.

Kraft soap can be reneutralized with sulfuric acid to restore the acidic forms abietic acid, palmitic acid, and related resin acid components.  This refined mixture is called tall oil. Other major components include fatty acids and unsaponifiable sterols.

Resin acids, because of the same protectant nature they provide in the trees where they originate, also impose toxic implications on the effluent treatment facilities in pulp manufacturing plants. Furthermore, any residual resin acids that pass the treatment facilities add toxicity to the stream discharged to the receiving waters.

Variation with species and biogeoclimatic zone
The chemical composition of tall oil varies with the species of trees used in pulping, and in turn with geographical location. For example, the coastal areas of the southeastern United States have a high proportion of Slash Pine (Pinus elliottii); inland areas of the same region have a preponderance of Loblolly Pine (Pinus taeda). Slash Pine generally contains a higher concentration of resin acids than Loblolly Pine.

In general, the tall oil produced in coastal areas of the southeastern United States contains over 40% resin acids and sometimes as much as 50% or more. The fatty acids fraction is usually lower than the resin acids, and unsaponifiables amount to 6-8%. Farther north in Virginia, where Pitch Pine (Pinus rigida)and Shortleaf Pine (Pinus echinata) are more dominant, the resin acid content decreases to as low as 30-35% with a corresponding increase in the fatty acids present.
 
In Canada, where mills process Lodgepole Pine (Pinus contorta) in interior British Columbia and Alberta, Jack Pine (Pinus banksiana), Alberta to Quebec and Eastern White Pine (Pinus strobus) and Red Pine (Pinus resinosa), Ontario to New Brunswick, resin acid levels of 25% are common with unsaponifiable contents of 12-25%. Similar variations may be found in other parts of the United States and in other countries. For example, in Finland, Sweden and Russia, resin acid values from Scots Pine (Pinus sylvestris) may vary from 20 to 50%, fatty acids from 35 to 70%, and unsaponifiables from 6 to 30%.

References

Biomolecules
Acids
Resins